Newton-on-Ayr may refer to:

 Newton-on-Ayr, a neighbourhood of the town of Ayr in South Ayrshire, Scotland
 Newton-on-Ayr railway station, in the Newton-on-Ayr neighbourhood

See also
 River Ayr
 Ayr (disambiguation)
 Newton (disambiguation)

Ayr